State Disaster Management Authority (SDMA) Azad Jammu & Kashmir is an autonomous authority mandated to act as leading agency in disaster management, its mitigation and preparedness in Azad Jammu & Kashmir, Pakistan. Azad Jammu & Kashmir is highly prone to multiple hazards and has experienced worst disasters situation due to earthquake, torrential rain/flood, landslides & avalanches in the recent past.

After the 2005 Kashmir earthquake that killed 100,000 people and left another three million people displaced, with widespread devastation, Government of Pakistan  promulgated National Disaster Management Ordinance, 2006 and established National Disaster Management Authority as the focal point at the federal level, while State Disaster Management Authority (SDMA) was established for Pakistan-administered Kashmir.

Saeed Qureshi serves as its director as of August 2022.

See also
 National Disaster Management Act, 2010
 2005 Kashmir earthquake
 2010 Pakistan floods

References

External links
 State Disaster Management Authority

Emergency management in Pakistan
Azad Kashmir